Duke Jupiter was an American rock band from Rochester, New York. They were active in the 1970s and 1980s on Mercury Records, CBS Records, and the Motown subsidiaries Morocco Records and Powerglide Records. They are best known for their hit single I'll Drink to You.

After the release of their first album Sweet Cheeks in 1978, Duke Jupiter started touring with national acts, including ZZ Top, Stevie Ray Vaughan, David Bowie, Bob Seger, Robert Palmer, B. B. King, Toto, Sea Level, Huey Lewis and the News, REO Speedwagon, Foreigner, Blue Öyster Cult, The Charlie Daniels Band, Outlaws, and John Lee Hooker.

Band History 
George Barajas died of a brain tumor in August 1982.

In June of 1982, the band played a free concert in Rochester and 25,000 fans attended. The concert was held at Ontario Beach Park and caused the biggest traffic jam the city had seen. The concert ended up making national news as well as MTV. 

Because of their rising popularity, the band went on to tour with REO Speedwagon, ZZ TOP, Foreigner, Blue Oyster Cult, and David Bowie.

Duke Jupiter played a farewell concert in their hometown of Rochester in 1986. This ended a 13-year career for the band.

From 1973 to 1986, Duke Jupiter released nine albums with four music videos that appeared on MTV. 

In 2014, Duke Jupiter was inducted into the Rochester Hall of Fame.

David Corcoran (born in Smithtown, New York) died of kidney cancer on June 21, 2018, at age 64.

Original band members 
 Marshall Styler - Lead vocals, keyboards
 Greg Walker - Lead vocals, Guitar
 Don Maracle - Guitar
 George Barajas - Bass guitar, background vocals, all recordings through portions of Duke Jupiter I
 Earl Jetty - Drums, Sweet Cheeks 
 David Hanlon - Drums, Taste The Night and Band In Blue

1980 to present band members 
 Marshall James Styler - Keyboards, lead vocals
 Greg Walker - Guitar, lead vocals
 Rickey Ellis - Bass guitar, vocals
 Dave Corcoran - Drums, Lead vocals

Discography

Albums 

Studio Albums

Live Albums

Duke Jupiter/The Restless Concert (1984) 
Captured Live! (1984)
Duke Jupiter Live in Concert 1984 (2012) Duke Jupiter records

Singles

References

External links

Musical groups established in 1973
Musical groups from Rochester, New York
Rock music groups from New York (state)